Northeast Express Regional Airlines was a regional airline based in Manchester, New Hampshire. The airline was originally known as Valley Airlines started by Maine businessman Roland Martin it capitalized on the US government essential air service by flying intrastate Maine to small communities that otherwise would not have access to airline services. Then the airline was bought by Allen Caruso of Bar Harbor Airlines fame. The air carrier rebranded as Northeast Express Regional Airlines and became a Northwest Airlines codeshare affiliate dba Northwest Airlink. The airline then declared bankruptcy and was liquidated, along with its sister company Precision Airlines, in 1995.

Former destinations served
Connecticut
Hartford (Bradley International Airport)
New Haven (Tweed New Haven Airport)
Maine
Augusta (Augusta State Airport)
Bangor (Bangor International Airport)
Bar Harbor (Hancock County-Bar Harbor Airport)
Frenchville (Northern Aroostook Regional Airport)*
Lewiston (Auburn/Lewiston Municipal Airport)*
Portland (Portland International Jetport) **
Presque Isle (Northern Maine Regional Airport)
Rockland (Knox County Regional Airport)
Waterville (Waterville Robert LaFleur Airport)*
Massachusetts
Boston (Logan International Airport) - HUB
New Jersey
Atlantic City (Atlantic City International Airport)
Newark (Newark International Airport)
New Hampshire
Laconia (Laconia Municipal Airport)*
Manchester (Manchester Regional Airport)
New York
New York (John F. Kennedy International Airport)
New York (LaGuardia Airport)
Quebec, Canada
Quebec City (Québec/Jean Lesage International Airport)
Those airports marked with an asterisk (*) are no longer served by commercial air service.
Norfolk 
Richmond
Laguardia
JFK
Hyannis 
Nantucket
Boston
Philadelphia 
Baltimore
St. John's NB
Fredericton 
Charlottetown PEI
Quebec
Montreal
Roanoke
Charlottesville 
Syracuse
Buffalo
Albany
Islip

Fleet
Beech 99 Airliner
Fairchild Metroliner III
De Havilland Canada Dash 8

See also 
 List of defunct airlines of the United States

References

Airlines based in New Hampshire
Northwest Airlines
Defunct regional airlines of the United States
Airlines disestablished in 1995
American companies disestablished in 1995
Defunct airlines of the United States